Chino Rodriguez (b February 2, 1954 - d November 5, 2022) is an American musician and impresario specializing in Latin music, salsa and Latin jazz.

Biography

Chino was born James Mui in New York City on February 2, 1954, in the Little Italy/Chinatown area of Manhattan to a Chinese father (Chueng Mui), who obtained U.S. citizenship by joining the Merchant Marines during World War II and a third generation Puerto Rican mother (Gloria Figueroa Rodriguez).

Early music career

Chino took music at Junior High School 65 on the Lower East Side of Manhattan. By his late teens, he had met Orchestra Dee Jay in Brooklyn, who soon allowed him into the fold as a band boy, then later as an occasional coro (chorus) singer. He formed his first band on the Lower East Side, simply called Chino Rodriguez and his Orchestra in 1968-69, playing at weddings, birthdays, and private parties. Through the local musician's union, American Federation of Musicians 802, he found work playing music for the  New York City Department of Parks arts program, from 1970-74.

Recording career
Chino recorded two albums for Ismael Maisonave's label, Salsa Records: Maestro De Kung-Fu, produced by Andy Harlow, and Si Te Vas Mi China, produced by Larry Harlow.

Maestro de Kung-Fu contained "La Computadora", the first Latin recording using a MOOG synthesizer, played by Larry Harlow. Cuban pianist Alfredo Rodriguez played on "Moonlight Serenade." Chino Rodriguez y La Consagracion was nominated for Latin New York Magazine'''s award for Best New Band. Chino's second album, Si Te Vas Mi China, was recorded in 1976 after a year's worth of daily rehearsals. It produced two hits upon its release in 1977 and, like his debut album, achieved gold status.

Latin music impresario

Chino began working part-time at Fania Records as a teenager after FANIA was about to purchase Salsa Records the Record Label Chino Rodriguez recorded on and started helping with the booking of the Fania All-Stars. Then Chino moved on to working as an independent booking agent representing many of the Fania artists such as Larry Harlow, Ismael Miranda, Junior Gonzalez, Bobby Valentine and many other Fania Greats. Chino returned to working full-time in the business side of the music industry in 1991, becoming Senior Vice President and General Manager of the newly formed Hidden Faces Records. After organizing business operations for Hidden Faces he opened his own artist management company, Chino Rodriguez Management (C.R.M.), and booking agency, OMNI Latino Entertainment (OLE), He opened his offices in Brooklyn, New York. In 2011, Rodriguez represented Latin hip hop artists Proyecto Uno, bachata artist Domenic Marte, and reggaeton duo Edgardo y D'niel, and bachata artist Alfred Martinez, Chino is presently working with many Reggaeton artist and young Rap Artist and is living in Florida.

DiscographyMaestro De Kung-Fu, SALSA Records, 1976. Re-released on CD 2004 by Mary Lou/SALSA Records.Si Te Vas Mi China, SALSA Records, 1977. Re-released on CD 2004 by Mary Lou/SALSA Records.

References

Sources
Flores, Juan. From Bomba to Hip Hop: Puerto Rican Culture and Latino Identity. New York: Columbia University Press, 2000; 
Leymarie, Isabelle. Cuban Fire:  The Story of Salsa and Latin Jazz. New York: Continuum International Publishing Group, 2002; 
Washburne, Christopher. Sounding Salsa: Performing Latin Music in New York City''. Philadelphia: Temple University Press, 2008;

External links
 Review and samples of Maestro de Kung-Fu
 Music of Puerto Rico
 Andy Harlow interview for Descarga
 Latin Music USA PBS documentary
 Chino Rodriguez's Personal Blog

Musicians from New York City
American music industry executives
Music promoters
Living people
People from Chinatown, Manhattan
Salsa musicians
1954 births
American musicians of Puerto Rican descent
American musicians of Chinese descent
Businesspeople from New York City